Patrick Michael Grundy (16 November 1917, Yarmouth, Isle of Wight – 4 November 1959) was an English mathematician and statistician.  He was one of the eponymous co-discoverers of the Sprague–Grundy function and its application to the analysis of a wide class of combinatorial games.

Biography

Grundy received his secondary education from  Malvern College, to which he had obtained a Major Scholarship in 1931, and from which he graduated in 1935.  While there, he demonstrated his aptitude for mathematics by winning three prizes in that subject.  After leaving school he entered Clare College, Cambridge, on a Foundation Scholarship, where he read for the Mathematical Tripos from 1936 to 1939, earning first class honours in Part II and a distinction in Part III.

The work for which he is best known appeared in his first paper, Mathematics and Games, first published in the Cambridge University Mathematical Society's magazine, Eureka in 1939, and reprinted by the same magazine in 1964.  The main results of this paper were discovered independently by Grundy and by Roland Sprague, and had already been published by the latter in 1935.  The key idea is that of a function that assigns a non-negative integer to each position of a class of combinatorial games, now called impartial games, and which greatly assists in the identification of winning and losing positions, and of the winning moves from the former.  The number assigned to a position by this function is called its Grundy value (or Grundy number), and the function itself is called the Sprague–Grundy function, in honour of its co-discoverers.   The procedures developed by Sprague and Grundy for using their function to analyse impartial games are collectively called Sprague–Grundy theory, and at least two different  theorems concerning these procedures have been called Sprague–Grundy theorems. The maximum number of colors used by a greedy coloring algorithm is called the Grundy number, also after this work on games, as its definition has some formal similarities with the Sprague–Grundy theory.

In 1939 Grundy began research in algebraic geometry as a research student at the University of Cambridge, eventually specialising in the theory of ideals.  In 1941 he won a Smith's Prize for an essay entitled On the theory of R-modules, and his first research paper in the area, A generalisation of additive ideal theory, was published in the following year.  In 1943 he was appointed to an assistant lectureship at the University College of Hull, which he left in 1944.  He was awarded a Ph.D. from the University of Cambridge in 1945.

Shortly after the end of World War II, Grundy moved away from the field of algebra to take up work in statistics.   In 1947 he began formal training in the latter discipline at the Rothamsted Experimental Station under a Ministry of Agriculture scholarship, graduating in 1949, when he then joined the permanent staff of the former organisation as an Experimental Officer.   In 1951 he was promoted to Senior Experimental Officer.  During his time at Rothamsted he performed most of his published statistical research, which included investigations of problems in the design and analysis of experiments, sampling, composition of animal populations, and fitting truncated distributions.

From 1954 to 1958 Grundy worked as a statistician at the National Institute for Educational Research.   During this period, he collaborated with Michael Healy and D.H. Rees to extend Frank Yates's work on cost–benefit analysis of experimentation.   The results of this collaboration were reported in an influential paper, Economic choice of the amount of experimentation, published in series B of the Journal of the Royal Statistical Society in 1956.  In 1958 Grundy moved to a position in the Biometry Unit at Oxford.  However, he retired from this position after only one term, due to ill health.

Early in 1959 Grundy married Hilary Taylor, a former colleague from the National Institute of Educational Research.   Although his health then greatly improved throughout 1959, he was unfortunately killed in an accident in November of that year.

List of Grundy's papers
With the exception of the final item, this list is taken from Smith's obituary (1960).  The first item is missing from Goddard's (1960) list, which is otherwise the same as Smith's.

 
 (with R.S. Scorer and C.A.B Smith)

 (with M.J.R. Healy)

 (with F. Yates)
 (with F. Leech)
 (with D.H. Rees and M.J.R. Healy)

  (with D.H. Rees and M.J.R. Healy)

 (with C.A.B. Smith)
. Reprint of Grundy (1939).

Notes

References

1917 births
1959 deaths
20th-century English mathematicians
Algebraists
Combinatorial game theorists
Recreational mathematicians
English statisticians
Alumni of Clare College, Cambridge